Yoon San-ha (Korean: 윤산하; Hanja: 尹產賀; born March 21, 2000), known mononymously as Sanha, is a South Korean singer, actor, and model under the label of Fantagio. He is a member of the South Korean boy group Astro and its sub-unit Moonbin & Sanha.

Early life 
Yoon San-ha was born on March 21, 2000. He graduated from Hanlim Multi Art School in 2019.

He is the youngest in his family. Sanha has 2 older brothers.

Career

2013–15: Career beginnings 
Yoon was accepted as a Fantagio  trainee on December 16, 2012. He was the third trainee to be officially introduced with the Fantagio  Photo Test Cut.

In August 2015, Yoon along with the other members of his group participated in the web-drama To Be Continued.

2016–present: Debut with Astro, Solo activities 

Yoon debuted as part of the six-member group Astro on February 23, 2016, with the mini album Spring Up.

In July 2018, Yoon was chosen as a host for the teenager focused talk show — Yogobara. He hosted alongside Gfriend's Umji.

In July 2019, Yoon and MJ were confirmed to be the MCs of the tVn D's variety talk show Blanket Kick at Night.

On March 4, 2020, Yoon was announced to be a new host for Show Champion along with band-mate Moonbin and Verivery's Kangmin.

On August 14, 2020, Fantagio confirmed that Yoon and Moon Bin would form Astro's first sub-unit, called Moonbin & Sanha. On September 14, 2020, they released their first extended play called In-Out, with the title track "Bad Idea". They received their first win from SBS MTV's "The Show" marking their first win as a sub-unit and third win as Astro.

On September 16, 2021, Fantagio confirmed that Yoon will be starring in a web drama titled Your Playlist alongside DreamNote's Sumin. The web drama premiered on October 15, 2021.

On November 19 2021, It was revealed that Yoon has been cast in the South Korean production of hit Off-Broadway musical Altar Boyz. Yoon will play the role of Abraham and will star alongside Golden Child's Y and Joochan, NU'EST's Baekho and SF9's Taeyang. 

In 2022, Yoon joined the KBS drama Crazy Love which was his debut terrestrial drama. 

On December 30, 2022, Fantagio released an official statement and stated that Yoon had decided to renew his contract with the agency.

Discography

Composition Credit 
All credits are listed under the Korea Music Copyright Association unless otherwise stated.

Filmography

Television series

Web series

Television shows

Web shows

Theater

Awards and nominations

Notes

References

External links 

 Yoon San-ha on Fantagio

2000 births
Living people
South Korean male idols
People from Gunpo
South Korean male television actors
K-pop singers
Astro (South Korean band) members
21st-century South Korean male  singers
Hanlim Multi Art School alumni
Fantagio artists